12–16 Church Street in Monmouth, Wales, is a row of three shop houses designed by the architect George Vaughan Maddox and constructed . They form part of Maddox's redevelopment of the centre of Monmouth and stand on Church Street, to the rear of Maddox's Priory Street. The architectural historian John Newman has written that Maddox's work "gives Monmouth its particular architectural flavour" and Cadw describes the grouping of 12–16 Church Street as "the best preserved early 19th century shopfront in Monmouth."

History
In the early 19th century, the main thoroughfare out of Monmouth towards London was along Church Street, a relatively narrow street now pedestrianised. Increasing traffic on the street led to a number of accidents and demands for the construction of a new road. At the same time, developments at the Shire Hall in Agincourt Square meant that the market, previously located there, required new accommodation. In 1834, the Town Council offered a prize for a redevelopment scheme, which was won by George Vaughan Maddox. Maddox, the son of another Monmouthshire architect, John Maddox, had already established a reputation within the town. Maddox's proposals envisaged a new road, described by John Newman as, "a remarkably early inner bypass", that would run north of Church Street along the west bank of the River Monnow. This would allow the redevelopment of Church Street and here Maddox constructed the block comprising 12–16, with an entry into White Swan Court CADW is of the view that the building has probably held a dispensary since the time of its construction, a period of 180 years.

Description
Numbers 12–16 Church Street form a single block of three storeys and four bays. The building backs onto Priory Street and has an arched entranceway into White Swan Court. Architectural elaboration includes a "heavy" architrave and a cornice at the roofline. The grouping is designated a Grade II* listed building, the high listing for "its exceptional architectural interest as part of an important piece of early 19th century town planning in the Monmouth centre."

Notes

Sources
 
 
 
 

History of Monmouth, Wales
Buildings and structures in Monmouth, Wales
Tourist attractions in Monmouthshire
Grade II* listed buildings in Monmouthshire